The British and Intercolonial Exhibition was a small world's fair held between 15 December 1923 and 2 February 1924
in Hokitika, West Coast, New Zealand to mark the opening of the Otira Tunnel and the diamond jubilee of Westland Province.

The patron of the fair was the Governor-general John Jellicoe and the vice-patron then-Prime Minister William Massey.

40,000 square feet were allocated for the exhibition.

Legacy
A statue of Summer was erected to commemorate the exhibition, and is now outside the Hokitika Museum.

References

External links
 An image of the East gate of the fair 
 Some souvenir cups from the fair
 Article positioning the fair against other New Zealand fairs

1923 in New Zealand
1924 in New Zealand
Hokitika
World's fairs in New Zealand
History of the West Coast, New Zealand